The 1936 United States presidential election in Nebraska took place on November 3, 1936, as part of the 1936 United States presidential election. Voters chose seven representatives, or electors, to the Electoral College, who voted for president and vice president.

Nebraska was won by incumbent President Franklin D. Roosevelt (D–New York), running with Vice President John Nance Garner, with 57.14% of the popular vote, against Governor Alf Landon (R–Kansas), running with Frank Knox, with 40.74% of the popular vote. As of the 2020 presidential election, this is the last occasion when the following counties have voted for a Democratic Presidential candidate: Banner, Blaine, Box Butte, Boyd, Burt, Chase, Cherry, Cheyenne, Cuming, Custer, Dawes, Dawson, Deuel, Dodge, Dundy, Frontier, Gosper, Grant, Harlan, Hayes, Hitchcock, Holt, Keith, Kimball, Knox, Madison, Merrick, Morrill, Pawnee, Perkins, Phelps, Pierce, Red Willow, Scotts Bluff, Sheridan, Sioux, Stanton, Thomas and Wayne. This would be the second-to-last time Nebraska would be carried by a Democratic presidential nominee, the last being the landslide of 1964.

Results

Results by county

See also
 United States presidential elections in Nebraska

References

Nebraska
1936
1936 Nebraska elections